Viliam Novotný (born 13 March 1973) is a Slovak neurosurgeon and politician. In 2002–2016 he served as a member of the National Council. For most of his political career, he was a member of the Slovak Democratic and Christian Union – Democratic Party. He left the party in 2014 over disagreement with the direction of party leadership. Since 2016 he has been the leader of the small party ŠANCA.

Novotný studied medicine at Pavol Jozef Šafárik University and Slovak Medical University. He is married and has three children.

References 

Slovak Democratic and Christian Union – Democratic Party politicians
Slovak politicians
Living people
1973 births
Politicians from Košice
Members of the National Council (Slovakia) 2002-2006
Members of the National Council (Slovakia) 2006-2010
Members of the National Council (Slovakia) 2010-2012
Members of the National Council (Slovakia) 2012-2016
21st-century Slovak physicians